The Conversion may refer to:
"The Conversion" (Seinfeld), an episode from the NBC sitcom Seinfeld
"The Conversion" (The Outer Limits), an episode from the TV series The Outer Limits